Legforus (died after 1200) was a Hungarian distinguished nobleman, who served as voivode of Transylvania from 1199 to 1200, during the reign of Emeric. His voivode title is documented by the earliest royal charter from 1199.

References

Sources
 Kristó, Gyula (2003). Early Transylvania (895–1324). Lucidus Kiadó. .
  Markó, László: A magyar állam főméltóságai Szent Istvántól napjainkig – Életrajzi Lexikon (The High Officers of the Hungarian State from Saint Stephen to the Present Days – A Biographical Encyclopedia) (2nd edition); Helikon Kiadó Kft., 2006, Budapest; .

Voivodes of Transylvania
12th-century Hungarian people
Medieval Transylvanian people